Stade Dominique Duvauchelle is a multi-use stadium in Créteil, France. It takes its name from a local sports journalist who died shortly before the stadium's inauguration.  It is currently used mostly for football matches and is the home stadium of US Créteil-Lusitanos. The stadium was built with an original capacity of approximately 6,000. It increased its capacity to 12,150 people in February 2006.

Its record attendance for a league match was for a match between Créteil and Saint Etienne on 5 August 2001 with 6325 spectators. The record for a cup match is 8000 in a match hosted there by amateur team US Lusitanos Saint-Maur against Bordeaux in the round of 32 of the French Cup on 19 January 2002.

References

Dominique Duvauchelle
Athletics (track and field) venues in France
US Créteil-Lusitanos
Sports venues in Val-de-Marne
Sports venues completed in 1983